Opthalmothule (meaning "eye of the north"), was a cryptoclidid plesiosaur dating to the latest Volgian (around the Jurassic-Cretaceous boundary), found in the Slottsmøya Member Lagerstätte of the Agardhfjellet Formation in Spitsbergen. The type species is O. cryostea.

Description 

It was noted to have unusually large eye sockets, which suggests a paleobiological specialization, such as deep water and/or nocturnal hunting. Along with Abyssosaurus, it is one of the youngest cryptoclidids known from boreal regions. The holotype is known from skeletal material that includes a complete cranium and a partial mandible, a complete and articulated cervical vertebrae, a set of pectoral and anterior to middle dorsal series, and the pectoral girdle and anterior humeri.

References 

Cryptoclidids
Tithonian life
Plesiosaurs of Europe
Late Jurassic reptiles of Europe
Jurassic Norway
Fossils of Svalbard
Agardhfjellet Formation
Fossil taxa described in 2020
Sauropterygian genera